Jaroslav Brož (8 November 1950 – 14 July 1975) was a Czech athlete. He competed in the men's long jump at the 1972 Summer Olympics. He died at the age of 24 of testicular cancer.

References

1950 births
1975 deaths
Athletes (track and field) at the 1972 Summer Olympics
Czech male long jumpers
Olympic athletes of Czechoslovakia
Sportspeople from Pardubice
Deaths from cancer in Czechoslovakia
Deaths from testicular cancer